Events from the year 1638 in France.

Incumbents 
Monarch: Louis XIII

Events
 March 3 – Battle of Rheinfelden: A mercenary army under Bernard of Saxe-Weimar, fighting for France, defeats Imperial forces.
 March 5 – Thirty Years' War: The Treaty of Hamburg is signed between France and Sweden by Cardinal Richelieu of France and representatives of Queen Christina of Sweden.
 December 18 – Cardinal Mazarin becomes premier adviser to Cardinal Richelieu on the death of François Leclerc du Tremblay (Père Joseph).

Births
 January 1 – Antoinette du Ligier de la Garde Deshoulières, poet (d. 1694)
 May 11 – Guy-Crescent Fagon, physician and botanist (d. 1718)
 June 8 – Pierre Magnol, botanist (d. 1715)
 July 11 – Olympia Mancini, courtier (d. 1708)
 August 6 – Nicolas Malebranche, philosopher (d. 1715)
 September 5 – Louis XIV, son of the incumbent king (d. 1715)

Deaths
 February 26 – Claude Gaspard Bachet de Méziriac, mathematician (b. 1581)
 April 13 – Henri, Duke of Rohan, Huguenot leader (b. 1579)
 December 17 – François Leclerc du Tremblay, friar and political adviser (b. 1577)

See also

References

1630s in France